Gerhard Engel (13 April 1906 – 9 December 1976) was a German general during World War II who commanded several divisions after serving as an adjutant to Adolf Hitler.  He was a recipient of the Knight's Cross of the Iron Cross with Oak Leaves.

Military career
Gerhard Engel joined the army in 1925, and served in the armed forces of the Weimar Republic and then of Nazi Germany. In 1938, he was appointed adjutant to the Commander-in-Chief of the Army. In 1941, he was promoted to major, and appointed an army adjutant to Hitler. He wrote a secret diary which was published after the war as "At the Heart of the Reich". In 1943, Engel was transferred to the Western Front. He fought in the Battle of Aachen, the Battle of Hürtgen Forest, the Battle of the Bulge, and the Battle of Halbe.

From 13 April 1945 until the end of World War II, Engel commanded the Infantry Division Ulrich von Hutten.

After his release, Engel was manager of a sugar factory in Nörvenich, and then of a machine factory in Düsseldorf. From April 1958 to December 1976, he worked as State Commissioner of the Society for Military Customer in North Rhine-Westphalia. Engel died in 1976.

Awards and decorations
 Iron Cross (1939) 2nd Class (26 February 1944) & 1st Class (23 May 1944)
 German Cross in Silver on 16 October 1943 as Oberstleutnant in Füsilier-Regiment 27
 Knight's Cross of the Iron Cross with Oak Leaves
 Knight's Cross on 4 July 1944 as Oberstleutnant and commander of Füsilier-Regiment 27
 Oak Leaves on 11 December 1944 as Generalmajor and commander of 12. Volksgrenadier-Division

References
Citations

Bibliography

 
 
 

1906 births
1976 deaths
People from Guben
Lieutenant generals of the German Army (Wehrmacht)
German prisoners of war in World War II held by the United States
Recipients of the Knight's Cross of the Iron Cross with Oak Leaves
Recipients of the Order of the Cross of Liberty, 2nd Class
Officers of the Order of Saints Maurice and Lazarus
Commanders of the Order of St. Sava
People from the Province of Brandenburg
Adjutants of Adolf Hitler
Military personnel from Brandenburg